Golden Future Institute, often abbreviated as GFI, is a comprehensive private institute for languages, computer and short time training skills, located in the capital city of Ethiopia, Addis Ababa. Golden Future Institute  was legally mandated in 2007 to provide a quality language and computer skills to the Somali Ethnic community in Addis Ababa.

History 
In 2007 the institute was originally started as English language school in Addis Ababa, Ethiopia, as the first Somali owned school. Then the school was expanded by providing other language courses (French, Amharic, Arabic and Somali), computer department, and as well as providing free short time training skills in leadership, team management and adult basic education.

Programs and Courses
Language, Computer and short time training courses.

References

Schools of English as a second or foreign language
Education in Addis Ababa